The Ultra-Fast Broadband initiative is a New Zealand Government programme of building fibre-to-the-home networks covering 87% of the population by the end of 2022. It is a public–private partnership of the government with four companies with total government investment of NZ$1.5 billion.

Targets
The Ultra-Fast Broadband project plans to provide speeds of at least 100Mbit/s downstream and 50Mbit/s upstream, though upgradable to 10 times that speed.

It aims to have optical fibre available to all schools and public hospitals, most private health facilities and most businesses by 2015. Urban and suburban residential areas have fibre deployed gradually, with new development areas being a high priority.

Initially, the plan was to have fibre within reach of 75% of the population by 2019 with an investment of $1.35 billion. In August 2017, the government announced the target was to be expanded to 87% of the population and to be completed by 2022.

Partner companies
Crown Fibre Holdings Limited (CFH) is a Crown-owned company set up to manage the project. CFH has contracted four companies to deploy fibre network.

The main partner is Chorus, which won 69% of the roll out area. Chorus was part of incumbent telco Spark but was split off into a separate company in order to participate in this project. CFH will invest NZ$929 million directly in Chorus with 50% being non-voting shares and 50% interest free loans.

There are also three Local Fibre Companies (LFC). These are 50% owned by Crown Fibre and 50% by the local electricity lines company or local government. They are:
 Ultra Fast Fibre (13.7%), a partnership with lines company WEL Networks covering the central North Island including Hamilton, Cambridge, Te Awamutu, Tauranga, Tokoroa, New Plymouth, Hawera and Whanganui.
 Northpower Fibre (1.6%), a partnership with lines company Northpower covering Whangarei.
 Enable Networks (15.3%), a partnership with the Christchurch City Council through its trading arm CCHL covering the Christchurch, Rangiora, and Rolleston areas.

The government aims to collect all the investment back in 2036. Due to the loan being interest free, the government expect this to cost $600m in opportunity cost.

Technology
The technology used is gigabit-capable passive optical network (GPON) for residential customers, and point to point for large businesses. Dark fibre is also available.

Chorus or the LFCs wholesale services to ISPs, who in turn offer services to their customers. There are 89 retail providers offering UFB services.

The original contract between CFH and the fibre network companies specifies that there are to be wholesale residential plans of 30Mbit/s download with 10Mbit/s upload and 100Mbit/s download with 50Mbit/s upload.

The fibre network companies also offer other residential and business plans. A gigabit residential service of up to 1Gbit/s download and 500Mbit/s upload and Business gigabit services (with higher CIR (committed information rates) are available in all UFB areas.

, unlimited residential UFB plans start from NZ$69.00 for 30Mbps download / 10 Mbps upload (50/10 at same cost in Chorus areas) NZ$72.00 for 100Mbps download / 20 Mbps upload (200/20 at same cost in Enable areas starting 1 July 2018 ) and  NZ$99.99 for 1000Mbps download / 500 Mbps upload.

Chorus reports that 76% of mass market fibre plans now sold are 100Mbps or faster and the average monthly data use by a fibre customer is 250GB.

Customers must arrange the final connection to the UFB network with their ISP, who in turn arranges connection with the relevant fibre network company. The fibre network company then installs the fibre lead-in from the street to the customer's premises, the external termination point (ETP) and the optical network terminal (ONT). If the fibre lead-in needs to travel along shared rights of way or through cross-lease land, all affected neighbours must consent to the installation. The standard ONT provides four gigabit Ethernet ports and two ATA phone ports. It is also possible to have ONTs that provide WiFi, or radio over fiber.

For each area an ISP wishes to serve, it needs to put in a handover point and organize a backhaul link back to its core network. (There are 33 points of interconnect (POIs), one for each UFB candidate area.) Therefore, only a few ISPs offer nationwide UFB services, and the majority only focus in a few areas. This is different to DSL, where Chorus can deliver all of an ISP's customers nationwide to a single handover point, so ISPs can easily offer nationwide DSL service.

Progress
The initial UFB project consisted of 33 areas covering 75% of the population and was completed at the end of 2019.

UFB2 (January 2017) will provide fibre to more than 151 new towns bringing coverage up to 85% of the population to be complete by the end of 2022.

UFB2+ (August 2017) will provide fibre to more than 190 new towns bringing coverage up to 87% of the population with the UFB2/2+ project to be fully rolled out by end of 2024.

The complete list of all UFB locations is available on the Crown Infrastructure Partners website.

, the original UFB project is 100% complete, with an uptake of 55%

History
The UFB project started as part of the National Party's 2008 election promise of an Ultra-Fast Broadband Initiative.

Initially, the Ultra-Fast Broadband network would not be subject to the regulations placed on other telecommunications companies by the Commerce Commission until 2020. After protests by telecommunications companies, consumer groups and opposition parties, the government allowed Crown Fibre Holdings to be regulated by the Commerce Commission. However, the government agreed to pay compensation to the partner companies if they lose money as a result of Commerce Commission regulation.

In 2015, the Government released a discussion document which sought views on how prices for UFB services should be set after 2019. The discussion paper ultimately resulted in the Telecommunications (New Regulatory Framework) Amendment Bill, which was passed in late 2018.

References

External links
Crown Fibre Holdings
Ultra-Fast Broadband Initiative, Ministry of Business, Innovation & Employment

Builders of the UFB network
Chorus
Northpower Fibre
Ultrafast Fibre
Enable

Internet in New Zealand
Fiber to the premises